Joseph McElderry (born 16 June 1991) is an English singer and songwriter. He won the sixth series of the ITV show The X Factor in 2009. His first single "The Climb" reached number one  on both the UK Singles Chart and the Irish Singles Charts. He was also the winner of the second series of Popstar to Operastar in 2011 and the first series of The Jump in 2014. In 2015, McElderry played the lead role of Joseph in the touring production of the Andrew Lloyd Webber and Tim Rice musical Joseph and the Amazing Technicolour Dreamcoat. In 2022, McElderry is set to perform a tour in tribute to George Michael.

To date, McElderry has released five top 20 albums – two of them reaching the UK top three. He was the first X Factor contestant to release a fourth album. As of 2014, McElderry had sold over two million records worldwide.

Early life
Joseph McElderry was born in South Shields, England, McElderry is the only child of Jim and Eileen (née Joyce) McElderry. The couple separated when McElderry was a child. He was raised in a small flat in South Shields.

McElderry attended Harton Technology College in Lisle Road, South Shields, before joining South Tyneside College to study AS level school qualifications. Subsequently, he joined Newcastle College to study performing arts. He was the Pride of South Tyneside's Young Performer of the Year in 2008. He studied for BTEC National Diploma in Performing Arts (Advanced Performance) at Newcastle College Performance Academy. In 2009, he took the role of 'Danny Zuko' in Grease which was performed at Harton Technology College.

Career

2007–2010: The X Factor and touring

The X Factor
McElderry auditioned for The X Factor in 2007 and made it to bootcamp. At the time, he believed that he was too young compared to the other contestants and opted to walk away. He auditioned again in 2009 and sang Luther Vandross's "Dance with My Father". Mentored by Cheryl Cole, he made it through to the live finals and was announced the winner on 13 December 2009, beating runner up Olly Murs with his version of "The Climb". McElderry's prize, as winner, was a recording contract with Simon Cowell's Syco record label, whose parent company is Sony Music Entertainment. The contract had a stated value of £1 million, of which £150,000 was a cash advance and the remainder allocated to recording and marketing costs.

Along with The X Factor finalists, McElderry recorded vocal for featured on a charity single, a cover of Michael Jackson's hit "You Are Not Alone". It was released in aid of London's Great Ormond Street Hospital. The finalists premiered the song live on the edition of 15 November of the programme; the single was available for digital download that day and a physical release followed the day after. The single reached number one in the UK Singles Chart.

McElderry performed the following songs during The X Factor 2009:

After The X Factor
McElderry's debut single, "The Climb", was available to download at midnight on 14 December 2009 and was released physically on 16 December 2009. According to industry sources, approximately 100,000 copies of the single were sold on the day of its release but it was not enough to knock Rage Against The Machine off the spot in the UK in its opening week. On 18 December 2009, it was announced that McElderry secured the top spot in the Irish Singles Chart for 11–17 December 2009.

"The Climb" was a contender for 2009's UK Christmas number one, competing against, and losing to, Rage Against the Machine's "Killing in the Name". McElderry's single sold 450,000 compared to Rage Against the Machine's 502,000 after a Facebook-based campaign was started in protest of The X Factors dominance of the Christmas number one title. This was the first time since 2004 that the X Factor winning single was denied the top spot for Christmas in the UK Singles Charts. Simon Cowell stated that he was "gutted for Joe because a number one single meant a lot to him. But I have to congratulate Jon and Tracy [Morter, who started the Facebook campaign]." McElderry's single stayed at number one on the Irish charts for a second week securing him the Irish Christmas number one (18–25 December 2009), and the song moved up to the top spot in the UK Singles Chart on 27 December. The single had the fifth highest sales of all UK singles released in 2009 staying one week at  1, and was the top-selling Irish single of 2009, where it remained at the top spot for four consecutive weeks.

"The Climb" was nominated in the British Single category at the 2010 BRIT Awards but lost out to fellow X Factor contestants JLS. McElderry performed "Don't Stop Believin'" and presented an award at the 15th National Television Awards in London on 20 January 2010. In January 2010, he participated in the Helping Haiti charity single, a cover of "Everybody Hurts" arranged by Simon Cowell in order to raise money for victims of the 2010 Haiti earthquake.

McElderry and seven other finalists, Olly Murs, Stacey Solomon, Danyl Johnson, Lloyd Daniels, John & Edward, Jamie Archer and Lucie Jones, appeared in the X Factor Live tour, which began on 15 February 2010 at the Echo Arena Liverpool and concluded on 4 April at the SECC. McElderry performed the songs "Don't Let the Sun Go Down on Me", "Love Story", "Sorry Seems to Be the Hardest Word", "She's Out of My Life", "Don't Stop Believin'" and his debut single "The Climb" on the tour. On 15 March, it was reported that McElderry had signed a modelling deal with Next Models.

2010–11: Wide Awake and Departure from Syco
In 2010, McElderry recorded his debut album, Wide Awake, which was released on 25 October 2010. The first single released from Wide Awake was "Ambitions", a cover of a song by Norwegian band Donkeyboy. He filmed a music video for the song in September 2010. Ambitions premiered on BBC Radio One on 19 September 2010. The single went on sale on 8 October 2010 in Ireland. It went on sale by digital download in United Kingdom on 10 October 2010, with the physical CD available for purchase in the United Kingdom the following day. The song debuted at No. 6 on the UK Singles Chart and No. 4 on the Irish Chart.

Wide Awake debuted at number 3 on the UK Albums Chart, with retail sales of 39,405 copies in the country during the album's first week of release. The album fell to number 20 on the chart the following week, and to number 40 the week after that. As of 4 December 2011, 101,454 copies of the album had been sold at retail in the United Kingdom.

"Someone Wake Me Up" was the second single taken from the album. It was released as a single on 5 December 2010 in the United Kingdom. It debuted and peaked at number 68 on the UK Singles Chart.

McElderry was approached by Twentieth Century Fox to record the specially written track, "There's A Place For Us", written by American songstress Carrie Underwood. The track features in the soundtrack to The Chronicles of Narnia: The Voyage of the Dawn Treader. and was also the B-side to "Someone Wake Me Up". The song was nominated for a Golden Globe Award in 2011 for Best Original Song – Motion Picture.

McElderry told Terry Wogan in an interview on BBC Radio 2 that he had parted ways with Syco in February 2011. McElderry told Tony Horne that he had a meeting with Syco staff members in February 2011. At the meeting, he expressed his unhappiness with the company, and told staff members that his relationship with Syco was not working for him. McElderry has also stated that his split with Syco was amicable, and there was no "fight" between them. He told the Shields Gazette: "I really like Simon Cowell and always think very highly of him .... There's no hard feelings there — there never has been and never will be." He told Capital FM on 19 August 2011 that he was "forever thankful" to Syco and Simon Cowell for the opportunity they gave him. He also denied a report (attributed to an unnamed "friend" in the Daily Mails article about Syco's dropping of him) that he was "devastated" when Syco dropped him.

Also in 2011, McElderry terminated his relationship with Modest! Management, the management company that had managed him since his victory on X Factor. In March 2013, McElderry signed to London-based Touchstone Media Group/Celeb Agents as his new management.

On 9 May 2011, McElderry performed the song "Something's Coming" from West Side Story at a reception at Buckingham Palace that celebrated young people in the performing arts.

2011: Popstar to Operastar and Classic

In late January or early February 2011, ITV approached McElderry's management about his being a contestant on the upcoming second series of Popstar to Operastar. McElderry agreed and entered the show, which started on 5 June 2011. His coaches were Rolando Villazón and Katherine Jenkins. Other judges included Vanessa-Mae and Simon Callow. McElderry won Popstar to Operastar on 10 July 2011. After the show it was revealed that, in all of the episodes in which he competed, McElderry received more votes than all of the other contestants combined, never receiving less than 58.2% of the total public votes.

On 11 July 2011, McElderry confirmed that he would be recording his second studio album.
The label was later revealed to be Decca Records. On 24 July 2011, he headlined a free homecoming gig at Bents Park as part of South Tyneside Summer Festival 2011, singing a set list of 20 songs, with over 20,000 people in the audience- the biggest turnout the event has ever had. His album, Classic, was released on 22 August 2011. Classic debuted on the official UK top 40 albums chart at number 2 on the chart that was released on 28 August 2011. The album was certified gold, within 10 days after the release.

McElderry performed at Festival of Remembrance on 12 November 2011. This was his third time performing before Queen Elizabeth II. He embarked on his debut solo tour, Classic Tour in November 2011 and appeared on Big River Big Songs: The Tyne, singing the title track, "Big River".

McElderry released a Christmas album entitled Classic Christmas on 28 November 2011. During the album's first week of release in the United Kingdom, 34,043 copies of the album were sold at retail in the country, and the album debuted at number 15 on the UK Albums Chart. On 8 December, he performed at Durham Cathedral to an audience of 1,500, singing, "In the Bleak Midwinter" and David Essex's "A Winter's Tale", with a new verse written by Tim Rice. He introduced The Nutcracker at The O2 Arena from 27 December 2011 to 30 December 2011 by singing 3 songs of Classic Christmas, "Adeste Fideles", "Silent Night" and a solo version of "O Holy Night".

2012: Here's What I Believe and musical roles

McElderry made an appearance on BBC TV series The Magicians in January 2012 and Newsround in February 2012, answering questions about what he was like at the age of 10. During the recording of his fourth studio album, he performed at The Royal Albert Hall in support of The Hunger Project, singing "Don't Stop Believin'", "Nessun Dorma" and a duet with Dionne Warwick, "One World, One Song". He was also scheduled to make a guest appearance in the Coronation Street musical, Street of Dreams, singing the finale number "Ghost – Take My Hand" in the show's Newcastle dates, originally set for 29 May and 30 May. After the first two shows, the later dates, including the ones on which McElderry was set to perform, were postponed and eventually cancelled. On 3 June 2012, he performed at the Thames Diamond Jubilee Pageant, he sang for guests on board a Dunkirk ship, The Viscount.

McElderry's fourth album, Here's What I Believe, includes collaborations with Beth Nielsen Chapman, Marcella Detroit and Ludovico Einaudi. Released on 10 September 2012, it reached number 8 in the charts, making it his third album to reach the top 10.

McElderry made a cameo appearance in a musical version of Dirty Dancing at the Sunderland Empire on Tuesday 25 September. He played Tommy in The Who's Tommy at the Prince Edward Theatre for a one-off appearance on 12 November He also appeared in Thriller – Live alongside Stooshe and Macy Gray. In November 2012, he became a columnist for Gay Times (GT), writing about his music and other recent projects. He wrote columns for four issues of the magazine.

2013–2014: Set Your Soul Alive Tour, Cinderella, and The Jump
On 8 February 2013, McElderry was awarded a Variety Silver Heart award. An event, 'A Tribute to Joe McElderry' was held to celebrate his career so far and where he was presented the award. Money raised on the evening went towards the children's charity 'Variety'. In March 2013, he appeared as a celebrity guest judge during the audition stages on the third series of Comic Relief does Glee Club.

McElderry went on tour for the summer of 2013, where he presented a new song, "Memory of You". On 17 November, he released the single "Wonderful Dream (Holidays are Coming)". In December 2013 and January 2014, he played the starring role of Prince Charming in Qdos Entertainment Pantomimes Cinderella at The Beck Theatre, Hayes. This was his pantomime debut, and he starred alongside Shane Richie Jr. for a 38 performance run. His single "Wonderful Dream (Holidays are Coming)" featured in the show. He also appeared as a guest on the James Whale Radio Show.

In January 2014, while on a skiing holiday, McElderry entered Channel 4 series hosted by Davina McCall, The Jump, as a last minute replacement to Henry Conway who was injured on the show. McElderry earned a place on the show after a jump-off with another celebrity sub, Donal MacIntyre, who would also join the show after the Melinda Messenger withdrew. In February 2014, McElderry was announced as the winner after jumping 17.5 metres off the K40 ski jump.

In 2014, McElderry performed a fifty-date tour throughout the UK called the Set Your Soul Alive tour. During this period, he also worked on material for his fifth studio album. After finishing the Set Your Soul Alive tour, he appeared on Kerry Ellis' self-titled album in a cover of "(I've Had) The Time of My Life".

2015–present: The Who's Tommy, and Joseph and the Amazing Technicolour Dreamcoat

In September 2015, McElderry again played the lead role in the rock musical The Who's Tommy, this time in a two-week run at the Opera House Theatre in Blackpool.

Also in 2015, McElderry landed the lead role of Joseph in the following year's UK touring production of the Andrew Lloyd Webber and Tim Rice musical Joseph and the Amazing Technicolour Dreamcoat. The tour began in January 2016 and ran through July 2016.

McElderry received very positive reviews for his performances as Joseph. Mark Leslie of the Lynn News called him "a shining star" in the role. Janet Tansley of the Liverpool Echo wrote that McElderry "breathed new life into this middle-aged musical", adding: "His voice was solid and silken and, simply, faultless, rendering 'Close Every Door' possibly the best version I have ever heard". Mark Shenton wrote in The Stage that McElderry "may just be the best sung Joseph there's ever been, bringing a vocal flair to Joseph that's utterly ravishing". John Wood of North West End wrote: "McElderry has been good from the moment the curtain rose; he has a good voice, obviously, and can really handle the comedy, but on Close Every Door he completely takes over, his voice filled with emotion and absolutely soaring; he has the audience breathless. He has made it his own and I can't imagine anyone performing it better. For his efforts he receives rapturous applause."

On 1 October 2016, McElderry started his Northern Light Tour.

Saturday Night at the Movies, McElderry's fifth studio album, features a collection of songs from films and musicals. The album was released on 14 July 2017 by Decca Records. McElderry promoted the album with a "Saturday Night at the Movies" national tour throughout July and August 2017, featuring Lloyd Daniels from the sixth series of The X Factor and Keith Jack and Ben James-Ellis from Any Dream Will Do.

Philanthropy
McElderry took part in the Great North Run half marathon 13.1 mile race on 19 September 2010 raising money for Teenage Cancer Trust, a charity for which he is also an ambassador. He performed at The Ray of Sunshine charity concert on 11 March 2011. Two days later, he performed at Theatre Royal in Newcastle to help raise money for Josie's Dragonfly trust. He also took part in a Comic Relief campaign, where celebrities and prolific Twitter users auctioned off the chance to be followed by a star, it raised £560.

McElderry performed on 13 July 2011 at the Newcastle Teenage Cancer Trust Unit. His acoustic set was streamed live to all other Teenage Cancer Trust units across the country as well as on the website. In 2012, he performed at the Sunday for Sammy benefit concert.

McElderry recorded a charity single with The Royal Mail Choir. The song, "Abide with Me", was released independently on 14 April 2013, raising money for Prostate Cancer UK. He took part in Soccer Six charity on 18 May. In the same month, he released a charity single with Dionne Warwick, "One World, One Song", which they had performed the year before at the Royal Albert Hall, raising money for The Hunger Project.

Personal life
McElderry was harassed by one Twitter user throughout 2010 and 2011. On 24 December 2011, a man was arrested in McElderry's home town of South Shields and later charged with harassment. The individual was found guilty, fined £1,000 and received a 5-year restraining order.

On 30 July 2010, shortly after winning on The X-Factor, McElderry came out as gay.

Awards and nominations

|-
| rowspan="2" style="text-align:center;"|2010
|"The Climb"
|BRIT Award for Best British Single
|
|-
|Joe McElderry
|BT Digital Music Awards for Best Newcomer
|
|-
| style="text-align:center;"|2012
|Joe McElderry
|Virgin Media Music Award for Best Act of Reality TV Fame
|
|-
| style="text-align:center;"|2013
|Joe McElderry
|Variety Silver Heart Award
|
|}

Discography

 Wide Awake (2010)
 Classic (2011)
 Classic Christmas (2011)
 Here's What I Believe (2012)
 Saturday Night at the Movies (2017)

Tours
The X Factor Tour 2010 (February 2010 – April 2010)
Classic Tour (November 2011)
2013 summer tour
Set Your Soul Alive Tour (March 2014 – June 2014)
The Evolution Tour (February 2015 – November 2015)
The Northern Light Tour (October – November 2016)
Saturday Night at the Movies (July – August 2017)

References

External links

1991 births
Living people
English people of Irish descent
Gay models
Gay singers
Gay songwriters
English LGBT singers
English LGBT songwriters
Musicians from Tyne and Wear
People from South Shields
Popstar to Operastar contestants
Singing talent show winners
Sony BMG artists
The X Factor winners
The X Factor (British TV series) winners
English gay musicians
English male models
Opera crossover singers
Italian-language singers
Game show contestants
21st-century English male singers
20th-century LGBT people
21st-century LGBT people